The Compleat Spell Caster is a 1983 role-playing game supplement for published by Bard Games.

Contents
The Compleat Spell Caster is a supplement to add to the magic systems of fantasy roleplaying games. The book offered variant classes for magic-users, such as mystics, necromancers, sorcerers and witches.

Reception
Craig Sheeley reviewed The Compleat Spell Caster in Space Gamer No. 72. Sheeley commented that "Unfortunately, The Compleat Spell Caster won't much help people playing Chivalry & Sorcery, and would only add confusion to AD&D. These games already have quite complete magic systems. Only a game with a small magic system would benefit."

References

Fantasy role-playing game supplements
Role-playing game supplements introduced in 1983